Arthur Desmas (born 7 April 1994) is a French professional footballer who plays as a goalkeeper for Ligue 2 club Le Havre.

Desmas came through the youth system at his hometown club Stade Brestois but failed to break into the first team and joined Chamois Niortais in the summer of 2015. He made his professional debut in November 2016 in a Coupe de France match against Stade Montois, and made his first league appearance later the same season.

Career
Born in Brest in north-west France, Desmas played junior football for Ploumoguer before joining the youth setup at Stade Brestois at the age of 11. Initially an outfield player, he transitioned to playing in goal due to his above-average height. During his ten years at Brest, he represented France at under-17 level, and went on to play several matches in the Championnat de France Amateur 2 (CFA2) for the club's reserve team between 2012 and 2015.

At the end of the 2014–15 season, Desmas was offered a trial by Ligue 2 club Chamois Niortais, who were in search of a new goalkeeper following the departures of Rodolphe Roche and Lucas Bobe. The trial period was successful and Desmas signed a one-year professional contract with the club on 23 June 2015. During his first season at Niort, Desmas was third-choice goalkeeper behind Paul Delecroix and Saturnin Allagbé, and as such was restricted mainly to reserve-team action, making 17 appearances in the CFA2. He also made the first-team substitutes' bench on six occasions, and at the end of the season was offered a two-year contract extension.

Following the sale of Delecroix to Lorient in the summer of 2016, Desmas was promoted to second-choice goalkeeper behind Allagbé, with new signing Alexandre Bouchard taking over as third-choice. Desmas made his senior debut for Niort on 11 November 2016 in the 2–1 away victory over Stade Montois in the seventh round of the Coupe de France. He went on to play in all five of the team's Coupe de France matches during the 2016–17 season, a run which ended at the last-16 stage of the competition with a 0–2 home defeat to French champions Paris Saint-Germain thanks to late goals from Javier Pastore and Edinson Cavani. On 12 May 2017, Desmas made his first Ligue 2 appearance, selected in place of Allagbé for Niort's final home match of the season against Strasbourg. The match ended in a 2–2 draw.

On 1 July 2022, Desmas joined Le Havre on a three-year contract.

Career statistics

References

External links
 

1994 births
Living people
Sportspeople from Brest, France
French footballers
Association football goalkeepers
Stade Brestois 29 players
Chamois Niortais F.C. players
Rodez AF players
Clermont Foot players
Le Havre AC players
Ligue 1 players
Ligue 2 players
Championnat National players
Footballers from Brittany